is the protagonist of Persona 5, a 2016 role-playing video game by Atlus. He is a second-year high school student who gets expelled due to a false accusation of assault from a corrupt politician. As a result, he leaves his hometown and moves in with a family friend in Tokyo to serve a one-year probation. Following his transfer to a new school, he and a group of other students awaken to a supernatural power known as the Persona. Soon after, they form a vigilante group known as the Phantom Thieves of Hearts, whose purpose is to explore the Metaverse, a metaphysical realm consisting of the physical manifestation of humanity's subconscious desires, in order to remove malevolent intent from people and cause a change of heart within them.

Joker also appears in a number of series spin-off media, as well as in various other cameo appearances outside of it, such as being a playable character in the crossover fighting game Super Smash Bros. Ultimate. He was designed by Persona series artist Shigenori Soejima, and is voiced in Japanese by Jun Fukuyama and in English by Xander Mobus. He has also been portrayed by actor Hiroki Ino in the game's stage adaptation. While the player can freely name Joker in the game, he is named Ren Amamiya in most appearances and Akira Kurusu in the manga adaptation.

Development and design 

Joker is a male teenage character created by artist Shigenori Soejima for the 2016 role-playing video game Persona 5. In the game, he is a second-year high school student who is charged with assault by Masayoshi Shido, an influential politician in the Cabinet of Japan. As Joker walks in his hometown at night, he witnesses Shido harassing a female subordinate. After Shido falls and injures his head due to him being intoxicated, he places the blame on Joker, a simple passerby, and forces his subordinate to testify to the police that it was Joker who pushed him. At the court hearing, Joker is told that he must serve a one-year probation and transfers to Shujin Academy, a school in Tokyo, as they were the only one that would accept him with his current criminal record. Needing a place to stay while there, Sojiro Sakura, an acquaintance of Joker's parents, offers to house him at his cafe Leblanc.

During his time at Shujin, he and other students awaken to their supernatural powers known as the Persona, becoming a group of vigilantes known as the Phantom Thieves of Hearts who explore the Metaverse, a supernatural realm consisting of the physical manifestation of humanity's subconscious desires, to change malevolent intent from the hearts of adults. Despite primarily being a silent protagonist, Joker occasionally speaks short phrases during cutscenes and battles; being voiced in Japanese by Jun Fukuyama and in English by Xander Mobus. Fukuyama used two different tones in the making of the series and felt proud of his performance. While the player can freely choose a given name for Joker, his Phantom Thief code name, he is canonically named  in most other appearances.  is used in the game's manga adaptation. Amamiya was chosen by the anime's producer who thought that the combination of his full name, which means lotus rain palace in Japanese, sounded "quite poetic" together. The producer further stated that remaking Joker's characterization in the anime was challenging, but was ultimately a success.

Joker is the leader of the Phantom Thieves of Hearts and is the only member with access to the Velvet Room as he holds the "Wild Card", an ability that allows him to hold more than one Persona and fuse them together to create more powerful ones. Joker's primary persona is Arsene, with him resorting to fighting with knives and handguns when he is unable to use his Persona powers. His ultimate persona is Satanael, the Gnostic equivalent of the devil and a deity who can harness the power of the seven deadly sins. Joker's initial Persona was originally the German demon Mephistopheles, but it was changed to Arsène as the latter character better fit the game's themes. The three main inspirations behind Joker were the original Arsène Lupin, The Fiend with Twenty Faces, and Ishikawa Goemon. The first character sketch of him was done in 2012. Soejima worked closely with game director Katsura Hashino so that Joker and the rest of the characters could properly reflect the game's themes. Joker has unkempt wavy black hair and dark grey eyes and wears a set of black glasses for most of his casual and school outfits. In the Metaverse, his apparel changes into a stylized black trenchcoat with a masquerade mask and winklepicker shoes, which were described as being designed after Belle Époque fashion.

As the main theme and narrative of Persona 5 revolved around crime and vigilantes triggered by Joker voluntarily choosing that path, Soejima needed to convey this while allowing the character to suit whatever dialogue choices the player decided upon. Due to these difficulties, Joker was given multiple designs in a trial and error process to find the best one. As the "phantom thief" premise was a common stereotype in fiction, Soejima initially drew Joker and the rest of the game's main cast in a style similar to shōnen manga, but these designs were scrapped as they clashed with the series' realistic aesthetics. Soejima likening his design to a black panther, which contrasts with the protagonist of Persona 4, Yu Narukami, being designed around the image of a loyal and sincere dog. He emphasizes the two-sided nature of his design, which ties into the theme of Phantom Thieves members living double lives. Despite Joker's uniformed appearance being meant to give off the impression of someone who is kindhearted and loyal to the system, his true nature is free-spirited and rebellious, with him being the type of person who plans things without telling anyone.

Appearances 
Joker was first introduced in Persona 5 as the game's main playable character, and has also appeared in series spin-off games Persona 5: Dancing in Starlight, Persona Q2: New Cinema Labyrinth, and Persona 5 Strikers. He is also a playable character in the 2018 crossover fighting game Super Smash Bros. Ultimate, being released as paid downloadable content for it in April 2019. He has also made appearances in other non-related games, such as Dragon's Dogma Online, Phantasy Star Online 2, Lord of Vermilion Re:3, Sonic Forces, Puzzle & Dragons, Granblue Fantasy, Catherine: Full Body, Star Ocean: Anamnesis, Another Eden, Tokyo Mirage Sessions ♯FE Encore, and Soul Hackers 2. He has also been portrayed by Hiroki Ino in Japanese stage play adaptations of the game.

Reception 
Critical reception to Joker has been positive, with fan art and cosplay of the character being popular. Upon the revealing of Persona 5, fans in Japan nicknamed him "Potter" due to his visual resemblance to Harry Potter, the main character of the Harry Potter franchise. Upon his announcement as a downloadable content (DLC) character in the crossover Nintendo fighting game Super Smash Bros. Ultimate, Masahiro Sakurai, the game's director and fan of the Persona series, stated that Joker was emblematic of the approach that he wanted to take with its DLC, adding that he wanted characters that were "unique", "different", and "fun" to use within the Super Smash Bros. environment. His appearance in Ultimate was met with praise, with game journalists noting the level of detail and how faithful his transition from Persona 5 was, as well as the enjoyment factor of playing him in general. USGamer criticized his relatively silent personality in the anime adaptation, negatively comparing him to the more talkative Yu Narukami in Persona 4: The Animation. Nevertheless, his relationship with Goro Akechi was praised. Xander Mobus's voice acting was the subject of praise by Siliconera. 

Various merchandise of Joker, such as figurines and action figures, has also been made. A Joker-modeled TT pistol airsoft gun, based on one that he uses in the game, was released in Japan in April 2019. His Phantom Thief outfit and a number of related accessories were also released by the Japanese fashion brand SuperGroupies in June 2019. An Amiibo figurine of him was released in October 2020.

Footnotes 
Notes

References

External links
 
 
 

Characters designed by Shigenori Soejima
Fictional characters from Tokyo
Fictional characters with evocation or summoning abilities
Fictional gentleman thieves
Fictional high school students
Fictional Japanese people in anime and manga
Fictional Japanese people in video games
Fictional knife-fighters
Fictional prisoners and detainees
Male characters in video games
Persona 5 characters
Sega protagonists
Super Smash Bros. fighters
Teenage characters in anime and manga
Teenage characters in video games
Video game characters introduced in 2016
Video game characters who have mental powers
Vigilante characters in video games